Forest research refers to agencies, organizations and departments that carry out forestry research:

 International Union of Forest Research Organizations with 700 member organizations
 Finnish Forest Research Institute
 Indian Council of Forestry Research and Education
 Forest Research Institute (India), Dehradun, India
 Forest Research Institute Malaysia
 Forest Research, UK government agency

Also:
 International Forestry Resources and Institutions, an international network linked to Indiana University, US
 List of forest research institutes